The 1930 Dominican Republic hurricane, also known as Hurricane San Zenón, is the fifth deadliest Atlantic hurricane on record. The second of three known tropical cyclones in the 1930 Atlantic hurricane season, the hurricane was first observed on August 29 to the east of the Lesser Antilles. The cyclone was a small but intense Category 4 hurricane, killing as many as 8,000 people when it crossed the Dominican Republic.

Meteorological history

The system is estimated to have formed on August 29 about halfway between the Lesser Antilles and the Cape Verde islands, although there were indications it may have formed closer to the African coast a few days earlier. Moving westward, the system slowly intensified, with its track and path based mainly on continuity. Operationally, the hurricane was first observed on September 1, while the storm was passing through the Lesser Antilles as an intensifying hurricane. Based on north winds in Dominica and south winds in Barbados, the evidence of the circulation prompted an observer to report, "[there are] evidences of an approaching hurricane." Cautionary advice was immediately sent out from Barbados to Saint Lucia, and based on additional ship and island reports, the National Weather Bureau issued storm warnings for the southern coasts of Puerto Rico and Hispaniola.

Due to the storm's small size, winds on the island were below hurricane force. Continuing slowly west-northwestward, the hurricane continued to intensify as it approached the Dominican Republic. Captain Thomas Evans of the SS Coamo of the Porto Rico Line, its crew and passengers all survived being buffeted by the storm for seven hours and passing through the eye. The New York Times published the story on September 5 as "Steamer Outrides Storm's Full Fury: Caught in Vortex of Hurricane, Coamo Tilts Periously as Gail Strips Decks". The worst of the hurricane occurred in a  diameter of its landfall location.

The mountainous terrain of Hispaniola rapidly weakened the hurricane, and by about 12 hours after moving ashore the winds decreased to tropical storm status. It quickly emerged into the Windward Passage and moved westward to the south of the Cuban coastline. It strengthened slightly, moving ashore near Tampa, Florida, with  winds. While crossing the state, it weakened to tropical depression status, although it re-intensified after moving into the western Atlantic Ocean. By September 12, it again attained hurricane status to the southeast of the Carolinas. It gradually weakened, deteriorating to tropical storm status on September 16 and dissipating the next day to the west of the Azores. The remnants merged with a system that later affected the Azores and Ireland.

Impact
The hurricane wrecked crops across the island and destroyed every ship at the harbor, killing two people. Rough seas also occurred along the coast of Saint Kitts, and a ship recorded a pressure of  near the island.

In southern Puerto Rico, the winds reached less than hurricane force, which caused minor to moderate damage to plantations. The precipitation was considered generally beneficial, due to previously dry conditions across the island.

Similarly, another observation in the capital city recorded winds of  before the roof it was on was damaged. It was estimated as among the strongest hurricanes on record to strike the country. Three entire districts of the city were almost completely destroyed, and an Associated Press report indicated "there was [scarcely] a wreck of a wall left standing". Overall, the hurricane leveled about half of the entire city. Due to its small nature, villagers  from the landfall location had no knowledge of the storm. The passage of the hurricane caused severe damage estimated at $15–$50 million, with the storm considered a major disaster in the area. The Red Cross estimated 2,000 people died in the city, with an additional 8,000 injured. However, the death toll may never be known, and historians estimate the hurricane left between 2,000 and 8,000 killed.

Minor effects were reported away from the coast; the mountainous terrain of Hispaniola greatly weakened the hurricane, which prevented significant amounts of further deaths or damage. Effects in the mountainous areas included downed trees and crop damage. In Haiti, the hurricane produced locally gusty winds and heavy amounts of rainfall, though exact damage details for the nation are unknown. Despite crossing the island of Cuba, no damage or deaths were reported there. The threat of the hurricane prompted the National Weather Bureau to issue storm warnings from Southport, North Carolina through the Virginia Capes. The strongest winds remained offshore, with minor damage reported along the Outer Banks. On Cape Lookout, the hurricane downed 12 small-frame buildings and damaged the city's Coast Guard headquarters. Power outages were also reported, leaving some areas on the Outer Banks isolated from communication to the outside world.

Aftermath

Relief work in the Dominican Republic began immediately after the hurricane, personally organized by the then-new President Rafael Leónidas Trujillo. The president deployed the entire nation's military within 24 hours of the passage of the hurricane. By the day after its passage, lack of food had become a problem, and large numbers of robberies had occurred. The winds downed all communications inside of the city, leaving damage details unknown until communications were partially restored a day after its landfall. The city plant of the newspaper La Opinión was destroyed, with three staff members killed; the remaining workers transmitted a damage story to offices in New York City, and included a plea for disaster assistance. The Red Cross office in Washington, D.C., sent  in aid a day after the hurricane struck.

See also

 List of Atlantic hurricanes
 List of deadliest Atlantic hurricanes
 Hurricane Georges
 Hurricane David

References

External links
 Monthly Weather Review

Dominician Republic
1930 Dominican Republic
1930
1930
1930
1930
1930
Dominican Republic Hurricane, 1930
Dominican Republic Hurricane, 1930
Dominican Republic Hurricane, 1930
1930 meteorology